"Recipe of a Hoe" is the second single released from Boss' debut album, Born Gangstaz. Though the single was not as successful as her previous one, "Recipe of a Hoe" still managed to become her second consecutive single to reach #1 on the Hot Rap Singles chart.

Single track listing

A-Side
"Recipe of a Hoe" (Radio Edit)- 4:16  
"Recipe of a Hoe" (Instrumental)- 4:30

B-Side
"Recipe of a Hoe" (LP Version)- 4:29  
"Born Gangsta" 3:32

Charts

1993 singles
Boss (rapper) songs
Dirty rap songs
1993 songs
Def Jam Recordings singles